Domenica Žuvela, also known as just Domenica (born 8 November 1992), is a Croatian singer.

Life and career
Žuvela started her singing career as a backing singer for Tonči Huljić's music project Tonči Huljić & Madre Badessa Band. In early 2017 she announced her departure from the band. Her debut solo single "Kad sam s tobom" was released on 3 July 2017. The song was performed at the 57th Split Festival in Split, Croatia. "Vidi se iz aviona" was released as the second single, later becoming her first song to chart on the Croatian Singles Chart.

On 17 January 2019, Žuvela was announced as one of the 16 participants in Dora 2019, the national contest in Croatia to select the country's Eurovision Song Contest entry, with the song "Indigo." She performed tenth and finished 13th.

Discography

Studio albums

Singles

Awards and nominations

References

External links

Living people
21st-century Croatian women singers
Croatian pop singers
People from Vela Luka
1992 births